Parkview High School may refer to:
Parkview High School (Lilburn, Georgia), United States
Parkview High School (Springfield, Missouri), United States
Parkview High School (Orfordville, Wisconsin), United States
Parkview Arts and Science Magnet High School, Little Rock, Arkansas, United States
Parkview Community College of Technology, Barrow-in-Furness, Cumbria, England
Parkview School (Dundee), Dundee, Scotland
Parkview School (Edmonton), Edmonton, Alberta, Canada